The Glavacioc Monastery is a Romanian Orthodox monastery situated in Argeș County, Romania.

History

It is generally considered it was built during the reign of Mircea I of Wallachia, who donated the village of Călugăreni, Giurgiu, to the monastery. The wooden church was replaced with a stone church by Vlad Călugărul in 1495. It was repaired by Mihnea Turcitul, Constantin Brancoveanu and the boyar Costache Faca. The monastery was closed down during the communist rule and reopened in 1991. The starets of the monastery is the hieromonk Casian Creţu.

References

Romanian Orthodox monasteries of Wallachia
Historic monuments in Argeș County